Macrobathra allophyla is a moth in the family Cosmopterigidae. It was described by Turner in 1944. It is found in Australia.

References

Natural History Museum Lepidoptera generic names catalog

Macrobathra
Moths described in 1944